Tarkington Independent School District is a public school district in north central Liberty County, Texas (USA). All 4 campuses are located on the same plot of land, with the High School facing County Road 2268, and the other three campus are along Farm to Market Road 163.

The communities served include Dolen, Hightower, Rayburn, and Tarkington Prairie.

The boundaries of the district are the Liberty/San Jacinto county line to the north, the Trinity River to the east, Luce Bayou to the south, and Tarkington Bayou to the east.

In 2009, the school district was rated "academically acceptable" by the Texas Education Agency.

One of the district trustees is Dwayne Stovall.

Schools

Tarkington High School (Class 3A; Grades 9-12)
In a nod to two Texas universities, the mascot is the Longhorn (the mascot of the University of Texas) and the school colors are maroon, white, and Vegas gold.(maroon and white are the colors of Texas A&M).
Tarkington Middle School (Grades 6-8)
Tarkington Intermediate School (Grades 4-5)
Tarkington Elementary School (Grades PK-3)

History
The area that now constitutes the Tarkington Independent School District was settled in 1826 when the first settlers purchased land from the Mexican government and became ranchers. The flat, wooded land was once open prairie where cattle grazed. Tarkington Prairie settlers wanted their children to have a good education, so they built several different schools with colorful names such as Box Island, Little Flock, and Pelican.

The many smaller schools soon became five school districts: Dolen, Hightower, East Tarkington, North Tarkington, and West Tarkington.  There was a rivalry among the schools in academic and sporting competitions.

The five districts consolidated into the Tarkington Consolidated School District in 1931. In 1954, Tarkington became an Independent School District and dropped "Consolidated" from its name. The number of students has grown, and the number of facilities has grown.

The old school building destroyed by fire in 1937 still stands in east Tarkington on County Road 2296.

Operations
Circa 1995 the annual cost per student incurred by the district was $3,895; around that time the average per-student cost in Houston-area school districts was $4,000-$5,000.

Notable alumni
Jason Grimsley - Retired Major League Baseball Player

References

External links

Tarkington ISD

School districts in Liberty County, Texas